Yan Zi and Zheng Jie were the defending champions, but chose not to participate that year.

In the final, Liezel Huber and Sania Mirza defeated Anastasia Rodionova and Elena Vesnina 6–3, 6–3 to win their title.

Seeds

Draw

References

2006 WTA Tour
Bangalore Open